H. Lee Swanson is a Distinguished Professor in the Graduate School of Education at the University of California, Riverside.  He is currently the editor of the Journal of Learning Disabilities and is the author of numerous academic publications in the areas of working memory, learning disabilities, cognition, intelligence, and achievement.  Between 1976 and 2011, he authored or contributed to over 224 academic books and articles, including The Handbook of Learning Disabilities and his contributions to the National Center for Learning Disabilities, making him an influential researcher in the field of education.

Swanson earned his B.A. in sociology/psychology from Westmont College (California), his M.A. in educational psychology from California State University (Los Angeles), and his Ph.D. in educational psychology from the University of New Mexico. He also completed post-doctoral work at the University of California, Los Angeles.

References

Living people
Year of birth missing (living people)
University of New Mexico alumni
University of California, Riverside faculty
Westmont College alumni
California State University, Los Angeles alumni